Icheon Citizen FC (Korean: 이천 시민축구단) was a South Korean football club based in Icheon City and former member of the K4 League, a semi-professional league and the fourth tier of football in South Korea. The club was founded in 2009 when disbandment in 2020.

Season-by-season records

See also
 List of football clubs in South Korea

References

External links

K4 League clubs
K3 League (2007–2019) clubs
Icheon
Sport in Gyeonggi Province
Association football clubs established in 2009